Jibei Island (Chipei Island) is an island in Baisha Township, Penghu County, Taiwan.

Geology

The island is located 5.5 km off of Penghu Island with a size of 3.05 km2.

Transportation
The island houses the Jibei wharf, with destination to Chikan wharf and Houliao wharf at Baisha island.

See also
 List of islands of Taiwan

References

Baisha Township
Islands of the South China Sea
Islands of Taiwan
Landforms of Penghu County
Penghu Islands
Taiwan Strait